The 1989 Davidson Wildcats football team represented Davidson College as an independent during the 1989 NCAA Division III football season. Led by fifth-year head coach Vic Gatto, the Wildcats compiled an overall record of 2–8. This marked the first season Davidson competed at Division III after dropping down from the I-AA designation following their 1988 season.

Schedule

References

Davidson
Davidson Wildcats football seasons
Davidson Wildcats football